Paul Carrichon (20 November 1856 – November 1911) was a French fencer. He competed in the men's masters foil event at the 1900 Summer Olympics.

References

External links
 

1856 births
1911 deaths
French male foil fencers
Olympic fencers of France
Fencers at the 1900 Summer Olympics
Sportspeople from Rhône (department)